Sebastian Amigorena is an Argentinian-French immunologist and a Team Leader at the Institut Curie.

Education and career
Sebastian Amigorena was born in 1960 in Buenos Aires. He studied biochemistry at Paris Diderot University, earning his Ph.D. in 1990 under the supervision of Wolf H. Fridman, with a thesis titled "FcR expression in B lymphocytes". He then went on to a postdoctoral fellowship in the laboratory of Ira Mellman at Yale Medical School. In 1995, he joined the faculty of the Institut Curie as a team leader, and is now director of the laboratory of Immunity and Cancer. He was elected to the French Academy of Sciences in 2005.

Research
Amigorena's research focuses on antigen presentation by dendritic cells. In particular, Amigorena's research group has studied the processes by which dendritic cells take up, process, and display antigens to T cells, as well as how this process is regulated by regulatory T cells.

Notable works

Guermonprez P, Saveanu L... Amigorena S (2003). ER-phagosome fusion defines an MHC class I cross-presentation compartment in dendritic cells. Nature. 425(6956): pgs. 397-402
Thery C, Boussac M... Amigorena S (2001). Proteomic analysis of dendritic cell-derived exosomes: a secreted subcellular compartment distinct from apoptotic vesicles. Journal of Immunology. 166(12): pgs. 7309-7318
Regnault A, Lankar D... Amigorena S (1999). Fcy receptor-mediated induction of dendritic cell maturation and major histocompatibility complex class I-restricted antigen presentation after immuno complex internalization. Journal of Experimental Medicine. 189(2): pgs. 371-380
Thery C, Regnault A... Amigorena S (1999). Molecular characterization of dendritic cell-derived exosomes: selective accumulation of the heat shock protein hsc73. Journal of Cell Biology. 147(3): pgs. 599-610
Zitvogel L, Regnault A... Amigorena S (1998). Eradication of established murine tumors using a novel cell-free vaccine: dendritic cell-derived exosomes. Nature Medicine. 4(5): pgs. 594-600

References

Paris Diderot University alumni
Living people
1960 births